Adriano Firmino dos Santos da Silva (born 4 November 1999), known as just Adriano, is a Brazilian footballer who plays as a defensive midfielder for Portuguese club Santa Clara.

Life and career
Adriano started playing youth soccer at Resende FC in his native state, Rio de Janeiro. In August 2018, he moved permanently to Cruzeiro, where he started playing at the U20s. After several good performances at the U20 team, the then Cruzeiro's coach, Mano Menezes, moved him up to the senior team in March 2019. On January 22, 2020, he made his professional debut in a Campeonato Mineiro match against Boa Esporte.

Career statistics

References

External links
 

1999 births
Living people
Brazilian footballers
Association football midfielders
Cruzeiro Esporte Clube players
C.D. Santa Clara players
Campeonato Brasileiro Série B players
Primeira Liga players
Brazilian expatriate footballers
Expatriate footballers in Portugal
Brazilian expatriate sportspeople in Portugal